Plaza Patrol is a short-lived 1991 British television sitcom on ITV, featuring Cannon and Ball. Cannon and Ball played incompetent security guards of a shopping mall. This was their final prime time TV series. The series was filmed at the now demolished Seacroft Civic centre in Leeds.

Episode list

References

External links

1990s British sitcoms
1991 British television series debuts
1991 British television series endings
ITV sitcoms
Television series by ITV Studios
Television series by Yorkshire Television
English-language television shows